Harold Brice Wilkes (September 11, 1932 – December 23, 2017) was an American football coach and college athletic administrator. He served as the head football coach at the University of Chattanooga from 1968 to 1972, compiling a record of 20–23. Wilkes was also the athletic director at Chattanooga from 1970 to 1990.

Head coaching record

References

1932 births
2017 deaths
Chattanooga Mocs athletic directors
Chattanooga Mocs football coaches
Chattanooga Mocs football players
People from DeKalb County, Alabama
Players of American football from Alabama